Totem is a 2007 album recorded by French pop singer Zazie. It was her sixth studio album, and her ninth album overall. It was released first digitally on 5 February 2007, then as a CD one week later. The album achieved success in francophone countries.

Background and release
As for her previous album Rodéo, Zazie participated in the writing and the composing, alongside her friends Jean-Pierre Pilot and Philippe Paradis. A duet with Scottish singer-songwriter Paolo Nutini appears in the track listing.

Unlike for her previous album, Zazie released "Totem" under various formats, including a collector edition composed of a set box and a 68-page booklet (illustrating the lyrics with photos of the singer in Iceland produced by Laurent Seroussi), a mini-CD with the demos of the songs "Je suis un homme" and "Jet lag" and a new song in English, "I Fall". The 2007 Christmas edition contains two other unpublished songs, including "Haut les mains", a song performed for the first time on stage at the Zénith in Nantes on 1 June 2007. This Christmas edition is also composed of a DVD with the music videos of "Des rails" and "Je suis un homme" as well as of their making-of, the making-of the album and the videos of preview for the Internet.

The album provided five singles, but four of them were only released under promotional formats ; "Je suis un homme" was a hit in France and Belgium where it peaked at number seven.

Chart performance and accolades
The album went straight to number-one in France and stayed for 101 weeks in the top 200. It also reached number-one, the second week of its release, in Belgium (Wallonia) and totalled 84 weeks in the top 100. It was ranked for 18 weeks in Switzerland but reached number ten.

The album was also nominated in the category 'Album of varieties' at the 2008 Victoires de la Musique, but didn't win.

Track listings

Credits and personnel
 Acoustic guitar and bass : Nicolas Fiszma
 Percussion and drums : David Salkin
 Piano, programming and keyboards : Jean-Pierre Pilot
 Sound assistant : Marc Guéroult
 Mixing : Yves Jaget and Jean-Pierre Pilot
 Executive producer : Sandrine Le Bars
 Mastering : Mike Marsh
 Photo and design : Laurent Seroussi

Release history

 ‡ Includes a mini CD and a booklet.

Charts

Certifications and sales

References

2007 albums
Zazie albums